Sainte-Anastasie (Provençal: Senta Anastasiá) is a commune in the Gard department in southern France.

Population

Sights
 Arboretum Sainte-Anastasie
 Saint-Nicolas-de-Campagnac Bridge

See also
Communes of the Gard department

References

Communes of Gard